Fortunato Cerlino (born 17 June 1971) is an Italian actor. He has appeared in a number of TV series in both Italy and the United States since 1997.

Selected filmography

Film

Television

References

External links 

1971 births
Living people
Italian male film actors